Selenoteuthis is a monotypic genus of squid from the family Lycoteuthidae. Its sole species is the small tropical and subtropical North Atlantic species, Selenoteuthis scintillans, the moon squid.

References

Squid
Bioluminescent molluscs